Stephanie Grace Young (1890–1983) was a notable New Zealand headmistress and educationalist. She was born in Stroud, Gloucestershire, England in 1890. She was headmistress of St Margaret's College, Christchurch in 1931.

References

1890 births
1983 deaths
Christchurch Girls' High School faculty
People from Stroud
English emigrants to New Zealand
Women school principals and headteachers
Heads of schools in New Zealand